Yoo Chae-ran (born 7 November 1992 as Yoo Hae-won Hangul: 유해원) is a South Korean badminton player who joined the South Korea national badminton team in 2011. At the Asian Championships, she won women's doubles bronze medal in 2013 and silver medal in 2017.

Achievements

Asia Championships 
Women's doubles

Summer Universiade 
Women's doubles

BWF Grand Prix (1 title, 3 runners-up) 
The BWF Grand Prix had two levels, the BWF Grand Prix and Grand Prix Gold. It was a series of badminton tournaments sanctioned by the Badminton World Federation (BWF) which was held from 2007 to 2017.

Women's doubles

  BWF Grand Prix Gold tournament
  BWF Grand Prix tournament

BWF International Challenge/Series (2 titles, 1 runner-up) 
Women's doubles

  BWF International Challenge tournament
  BWF International Series tournament

References

External links 
 

1992 births
Living people
Sportspeople from Gwangju
South Korean female badminton players
Badminton players at the 2014 Asian Games
Asian Games silver medalists for South Korea
Asian Games medalists in badminton
Medalists at the 2014 Asian Games
Universiade gold medalists for South Korea
Universiade bronze medalists for South Korea
Universiade medalists in badminton
Medalists at the 2015 Summer Universiade
21st-century South Korean women